Eumecia anchietae, also known commonly as Anchieta's serpentiform skink, Anchieta's snake skink, and the western serpentiform skink, is a species of lizard in the family Scincidae. The species is endemic to Africa. There are three recognized subspecies.

Etymology
The specific name, anchietae, is in honor of Portuguese naturalist José Alberto de Oliveira Anchieta, who was an explorer of Africa.

Geographic range
E. anchietae is found in Angola, the Democratic Republic of the Congo, Kenya, Tanzania, and Zambia.

Habitat

Description
The limbs of E. anchietae are very reduced. The front legs are minute, each with two toes. The hind legs are twice as large (but still very small), each with three toes. The body and tail are subcylindrical and elongate.

Behavior
E. anchietae is diurnal and terrestrial.

Reproduction
E. anchietae is viviparous.

Subspecies
Three subspecies are recognized as being valid, including the nominotypical subspecies.
Eumecia anchietae anchietae 
Eumecia anchietae major  – Lunda western snake skink
Eumecia anchietae wittei

References

Further reading
Bocage JVB (1870). "Description d'un Saurien nouveau de l'Afrique occidentale ". Jornal de Sciencias Mathematicas Physicas e Naturaes, Academia Real das Sciencias de Lisboa 3: 66–68 + Plate I. (Eumecia anchietae, new species, pp. 67–68 + Plate I, figures 1–5). (in French).
Laurent RF (1964). "Reptiles et batraciens de l'Angola (troisième contribution)". Companhia de Diamantes de Angola (DIAMANG), Serviços Culturais, Museu do Dundo (Angola) 67: 1–165. (Eumecia anchietae major, new subspecies, p. 80; E. a. wittei, new subspecies, p. 80). (in French).
Spawls S, Howell K, Henkel H, Menegon M (2018). Field Guide to East African Reptiles, Second Edition. London: Bloomsbury Natural History. 624 pp. . (Eumecia anchietae, p. 130).

Eumecia
Skinks of Africa
Reptiles of Angola
Reptiles of the Democratic Republic of the Congo
Reptiles of Kenya
Reptiles of Tanzania
Reptiles of Zambia
Reptiles described in 1870
Taxa named by José Vicente Barbosa du Bocage